Amazon Trail 3rd Edition: Rainforest Adventures is a 1998 game based on the video game The Oregon Trail. It is not a true sequel to the franchise, but is rather largely the same game as Amazon Trail II, only with updated graphics and interfaces and fixing major bugs that caused problems in the second game. The game is published by The Learning Company.

Gameplay
Challenges of Teaching with Technology Across the Curriculum describes the gameplay as follows: "Journey into uncharted rainforests, where intrigue lurks everywhere in the Rainforest. Along the way, students travel back through time, meeting people from previous centuries who may or may not help them complete their adventures".

The game aims to make ecology, geography, and critical thinking fun. The game includes "photo-realistic rain forest scenes".

Development
The game was announced in May 1998.

Critical reception
GiantMike gave the game a rating of 8/10 stars, commenting: "If you have children, or just enjoy edutainment games, Amazon Trail is perfect. Ever since the original Oregon Trail, this series has been immensely popular with school children. Every version since then has just gotten better and better, and this one is no exception".  wrote: "It's supposed to be an exotic journey through the luscious Amazon region. Yet somehow, the Learning Company's third iteration of its Amazon Trail program does more to squelch one's primal desire to explore than it does to encourage it". Challenges of Teaching with Technology Across the Curriculum gave the game an evaluation score of 185 when analysing its suitability for social studies classrooms. PC Magazine wrote "[players'] lives will depend upon implementing what they've learnt about botany, geography, habitats, and social science along the trail...Such is the premise behind Amazon Trail's immersive, enlightening, and altogether entertaining trek through science and nature".

References

External links
 
 Entry in Software and CD-ROM Reviews on File, Volume 15
 Entry in The Complete Sourcebook on Children's Software
 Latina
 CD-ROMs in print
 Personal Computer Magazine, volume 17, issues #20-22

1998 video games
Windows games
Classic Mac OS games
Children's educational video games
The Oregon Trail (series)
Video game sequels
Video games set in forests
Video games set in South America
The Learning Company games
Video games developed in the United States